Thomas Ruffin Jr. (September 21, 1824 – May 23, 1889) was a justice of the North Carolina Supreme Court from 1881 to 1883.

Born in Hillsborough, North Carolina, he was the fourth son of North Carolina Chief Justice Thomas Ruffin and Anne Kirkland Ruffin, and the grandson of state legislator Sterling Ruffin.

References

Justices of the North Carolina Supreme Court
1824 births
1889 deaths
19th-century American judges
Ruffin family
Confederate States Army officers